The 1975 Czechoslovak motorcycle Grand Prix was the eleventh round of the 1975 Grand Prix motorcycle racing season. It took place on the weekend of 22–24 August 1975 at the Brno Circuit.

500cc classification

References

Czech Republic motorcycle Grand Prix
Czechoslovak
Motorcycle Grand Prix